Raja Mamai is a 2016 Sri Lankan Sinhala comedy film directed by Kalyana Chandrasekera and produced by A. Parister for Nero Entertainment. It stars Bindu Botalegama in lead role along with Premadasa Vithanage and Chathura Perera. Music composed by Sarath Wickrama. It is the 1262nd Sri Lankan film in the Sinhala cinema.

Plot

Cast
 Bindu Botalegama as Chammi Panawanna / IC Pradeep
 Madhi Panditharatne as Theja Thenuwara
 Premadasa Vithanage as Peter Thenuwara
 Chathura Perera
 Dayasiri Hettiarachchi as Mudalali
 Manel Chandralatha as Violet

Soundtrack

References

2016 films
2010s Sinhala-language films
2016 comedy films
Sri Lankan comedy films